Abdelaziz Sahere (born 1 January 1967) is a Moroccan long-distance runner who competed mostly over 1500 metres and 3000 metre steeplechase.

Achievements

External links
 
 

1967 births
Living people
Moroccan male middle-distance runners
Moroccan male steeplechase runners
Athletes (track and field) at the 1988 Summer Olympics
Athletes (track and field) at the 1992 Summer Olympics
Athletes (track and field) at the 1996 Summer Olympics
Olympic athletes of Morocco
Mediterranean Games gold medalists for Morocco
Mediterranean Games bronze medalists for Morocco
Mediterranean Games medalists in athletics
Athletes (track and field) at the 1991 Mediterranean Games
Athletes (track and field) at the 1993 Mediterranean Games
20th-century Moroccan people
21st-century Moroccan people